Pietro Campofregoso (1417 – 14 September 1459) was Doge of Genoa from 1450 to 1458.

Biography

Family 
He was a grandson of Tommaso di Campofregoso, he was a vassal of the Visconti as lord of Gavi. Married to Bartolomea Grimaldi, he had six sons, one of which, Battista Fregoso, was later also doge of Genoa.

Life as Doge 
He was elected as doge on 8 September 1450, succeeding his cousin Lodovico di Campofregoso. His rule was one of the most disastrous for the eastern colonies of the Republic of Genoa. In this period Genoa lost Pera in Turkey, Caffa in Crimea and Chios in Greece, while the flourishing trade with those regions declined. In 1458, after turmoil with Turk and Aragonese soldiers, and with the Ghibelline faction in Genoa, Pietro asked King Charles VII of France for help. This however turned into an effective submission of Genoa to France, which lasted until 1461.

After a vain attempt at insurrection against the French, Pietro was stoned by the populace near the Porta Soprana on 14 September 1459. He was the first Grand Master of the Military Order of St. George.

In popular media
Pietro di Campofregoso is played by Ali Ersin Yenar in 2012 film Fetih 1453. In the film, Pietro, not mentioned by name, orders Giovanni Giustiniani (Cengiz Coşkun) to command Genoese army to help Byzantine Empire preparing for war against the Ottoman Empire after an assault towards a Genoese freight by the Turks in the Bosphorus.

References

External links
 Biography of Pietro (in Italian)

1417 births
1459 deaths
Pietro
15th-century Doges of Genoa